Kristian Humaidan (born 1981, Svendborg, Denmark), better known by his stage name UFO, is a Danish singer, rapper and hip hop artist. He was part of the rap duo UFO Yepha before splitting-up and going solo. With the split, UFO is noticeably branching into Danish music rather than hip hop as in the days with Yepha.

2002–2011:As UFO and Yepha

Kristian Humaidan (known as UFO) won the freestyle championship MC's Fight Night in 2002. Soon he started collaborating as a duo with Jeppe Bruun Wahlstrøm (known as Yepha, born 1983) through Svendborg, and later from Aarhus. They were also known as Whyyou (taking lead from first letters of their names). They had a good number of chart successes before they split-up as a duo in 2011.

They had three albums charting on the official Danish Albums Chart as follows:
U vs. Y (2003 – reached #28)
Ingen som os (2006 – reached #20)
Kig mig i øjnene (2008 – reached #32)

They released many singles as UFO and Yepha including charting singles:
"Hver dag" (2003, reached #1)
"Næh næh" (Ufo Yepha feat. Anna David) (2008 – reached #20)
"Stille og roligt knald pa" (2009, reached #27)

2011– : Solo career
UFO's debut album as a solo artist is Humaidan. It was released by Universal Music Denmark on 24 October 2011.

Discography

Albums
(for albums as UFO Yepha details, see UFO Yepha)

Solo

Singles
(Selective and only charting singles)
(for singles as UFO & Yepha details, see UFO & Yepha)

UFO (Solo)

References

External links
Kristian Humaidan UFO Facebook

Danish male singers
Danish hip hop musicians
Danish rappers
1981 births
Living people
People from Svendborg
Date of birth missing (living people)